The 2012 Central Connecticut Blue Devils football team represented Central Connecticut State University in the 2012 NCAA Division I FCS football season. They were led by seventh year head coach Jeff McInerney and played their home games at Arute Field. They are a member of the Northeast Conference. They finished the season 2–8, 2–5 in NEC play to finish in eighth place.

Schedule

Monmouth game on November 3 cancelled due to effects from Hurricane Sandy.

References

Central Connecticut
Central Connecticut Blue Devils football seasons
Central Connecticut Blue Devils football